The Isle of Man is a self-governing crown dependency in the Irish Sea between England and Northern Ireland. The head of state is Queen Elizabeth II, who holds the title of Lord of Mann. The Lord of Mann is represented by a lieutenant governor. Foreign relations and defence are the responsibility of the British Government.

The Isle of Man is a low-tax economy with no capital gains tax, wealth tax, stamp duty, or inheritance tax and a top rate of income tax of 20%. The rate of corporation tax is 0% for almost all types of income; the only exceptions are that the profits of banks are taxed at 10%, as is rental (or other) income from land and buildings situated on the Isle of Man.

Offshore banking, manufacturing, and tourism form key sectors of the economy. Agriculture and fishing, once the mainstays of the economy, now make declining contributions to the island's Gross Domestic Product (GDP).

Notable firms 
This list includes notable companies with primary headquarters located in the country. The industry and sector follow the Industry Classification Benchmark taxonomy. Organizations which have ceased operations are included and noted as defunct.

References 

Isle of Man

Isle of Man-related lists
Isle of Man
Lists of organisations based in the Isle of Man